Time (The Revelator) is the third studio album by American singer-songwriter Gillian Welch. All songs were written by Welch together with David Rawlings and were recorded at RCA Studio B, Nashville, Tennessee, with the exception of "I Want to Sing That Rock and Roll", which was recorded live at the Ryman Auditorium as part of the sessions for the concert film Down from the Mountain.

Recording
Welch said of recording "Revelator," "It was a mic test – the version on the record. Dave just said, 'play 'Revelator' and it was okay, let's try it and we used the mic test." Rawlings added, "We played it once and it was great because we hadn't played it in months.  We got that first take feeling."

According to Rawlings, "I Dream a Highway" had never been played before it was recorded. "So, we played it twice and I edited both versions together.  But, I wanted that because I knew it was a minor song that had ... There was a lot that could happen with the harmonies and the guitar playing than if we'd done it a lot of times, so we could just travel through a lot more of it than if we knew where we were supposed to start and where we were supposed to end."

Critical reception

Welch and Rawlings received a great deal of recognition for their work on Time.  The album received many award nominations and was included on many "best album of the year" lists by critics.  It has since been included on a number of "best of all time" lists.

In 2009, the album was ranked #7 on Pastes "The 50 Best Albums of the Decade" list. It was also included in the book 1001 Albums You Must Hear Before You Die.  The album was ranked 64 on Rolling Stone magazine's list of the 100 greatest albums of the decade, and in 2020 the album was ranked number 348 in their updated list of the 500 Greatest Albums of All Time.

Awards
Although Welch and Rawlings did not win in any category, the duo received four nominations at the first annual awards for the Americana Music Association in 2002.  Time (The Revelator) was nominated for Album of the Year, and "I Want to Sing That Rock and Roll" was nominated for Song of the Year (prizes that went to Buddy and Julie Miller's Buddy & Julie Miller and "She's Looking at Me" by Jim Lauderdale, Ralph Stanley and the Clinch Mountain Boys).  Welch and Rawlings together were nominated for Artist of the Year while Rawlings was nominated for Instrumentalist of the Year (awarded to Jim Lauderdale and Jerry Douglas respectively).

The album was also nominated for Best Contemporary Folk Album at the 2002 Grammy Awards, but lost out to Bob Dylan's Love and Theft.

Best album of the year lists

Track listing
All songs written by Gillian Welch and David Rawlings.
 "Revelator" – 6:22
 "My First Lover" – 3:47
 "Dear Someone" – 3:14
 "Red Clay Halo" – 3:14
 "April the 14th Part 1" – 5:10
 "I Want to Sing That Rock and Roll" – 2:51
 "Elvis Presley Blues" – 4:53
 "Ruination Day Part 2" – 2:36
 "Everything Is Free" – 4:48
 "I Dream a Highway" – 14:39

Credits

Musicians
 Gillian Welch – banjo, guitar, vocals
 David Rawlings – guitar, vocals

Production
Recorded at RCA Studio B, Nashville, Tennessee
Produced by David Rawlings
Engineered by Matt Andrews
 except "I Want to Sing That Rock and Roll":
Recorded live at the Ryman Auditorium, Nashville, Tennessee
Produced by T-Bone Burnett
Engineered by Mike Piersante & Matt Andrews
Also available on Down from the Mountain (2001, Lost Highway)
Mastered by Steve Marcussen at Marcussen Mastering, Los Angeles, California

Artwork
Design by Frank Olinsky
Photography by Mark Seliger

Charts

Notes and sources

External links 
 Melissa Block, "Gillian Welch and David Rawlings" (live in-studio interview), All Things Considered, NPR, August 10, 2001
 Nick spitzer, "Words and Music", American Routes, PRI, January 9, 2002 (episode playlist, audio segment with Gillian Welch{requires RealPlayer})

2001 albums
Gillian Welch albums